Ayman Odeh (born 1 January 1975) is an Israeli Arab lawyer and politician. He is a member of Knesset and leader of the Hadash party.

Biography
Ayman Odeh was born in 1975, and raised in Haifa, within the Kababir neighbourhood. His father was a construction worker. Although his family was Muslim, Odeh's parents sent him to a Christian school where he was the only Muslim student, proudly noting that he got an A in New Testament studies on his high school final exams. He now describes himself as having transcended the confines of religion and ethnicity. He studied law at the University of Craiova in Romania from 1993 to 1997. During his law studies in Romania, he took part in pro-Palestinian rallies, learned Romanian, and read the memoirs of various political thinkers and revolutionaries. He earned a Bachelor of Laws degree from the University of Craiova and in 2001 was certified to practice law in Israel, though he is not a member of the Israel Bar Association. 

Odeh is married to Nardine Aseli, a gynecologist, whom he met at the wake for her 17-year-old brother who was killed in 2000 at the start of the Second Intifada. They have three children.

He speaks Arabic, Hebrew, English, and Romanian.

Political career

Odeh joined Hadash, and represented it on Haifa City Council between 1998 and 2005, before becoming the party's secretary-general in 2006. He was placed 75th on the party's list for the 2009 elections, in which Hadash won four seats. He won sixth place on the party's list for the 2013 Knesset elections, but failed to enter the Knesset, as the party again won four seats.

Following the announcement that Hadash leader Mohammed Barakeh was resigning prior to the 2015 elections, Odeh was elected as the party's new leader. In the buildup to the 2015 elections, Hadash joined the Joint List, an alliance of the main Arab parties. Odeh was placed at the head of the Joint List's electoral list. Analysts credited the charismatic Odeh for giving the Arab political union a more moderate, pragmatic face. Odeh was elected to the 20th Knesset, along with 12 other candidates from the Joint List.

In an interview with The Times of Israel, Odeh discussed the Joint List's social agenda, including a 10-year plan to tackle issues pertinent to the Arab sector, such as employment of women, rehabilitation of failing regional councils, recognition of unrecognized Bedouin communities in the Negev, public transportation in Arab towns, and eradication of violence. He also said he supported the right of the Jewish people to self-determination in Israel, adding that a Palestinian state should fulfill the same goals for Arab Palestinians.

Odeh's campaign for the March 2015 elections had a "breakthrough moment" when, in a televised debate of candidates, Avigdor Lieberman, Israel's foreign minister, called Odeh a "Palestinian citizen" and said Odeh was not welcome in Israel. Odeh replied, "I am very welcome in my homeland. I am part of the nature, the surroundings, the landscape", contrasting his birth in Israel with Lieberman's immigration from the former Soviet Union. Odeh is now viewed as a potential power broker given that Arab parties appear to be uniting to meet the government's requirement that parties meet a minimum threshold of votes to secure a place in the Knesset. Odeh has a style that contrasts with that of MK Haneen Zoabi, who is more confrontational. Odeh voices his willingness to work with Jewish partners, and he often quotes Martin Luther King Jr.

In the 2020 election, Odeh and the Joint List recommended Benny Gantz for prime minister.

Award and recognition
 Listed as top 100 leading global thinkers by Foreign Policy magazine
 Listed as top 100 influential by TheMarker magazine for the year 2016, and was listed in the 9th place
 Listed as top 100 influential by TheMarker magazine for the year 2017

Views and opinions
Odeh says his service on Haifa City Council made it clear to him that Arabs and Jews must work together. He describes Haifa as "the most liberal multicultural yet homogenous city in Israel".

Odeh has also expressed strong support for increasing recognition of Mizrahi culture and Arab Jewish history in official Israeli and Palestinian discourses; in a widely cited speech to the Knesset plenum in July 2015, MK Odeh argued that the State of Israel has systematically discriminated against and suppressed the culture of Jews who immigrated to Israel from Arab and Muslim lands (who make up the majority of the Israeli population ) in order to feed the idea of a natural separation between Jews and Arabs. He also argued that the large role played by Jews in forming historical and modern Arab culture (including famous Jews such as Rabbi David Buzaglo, who wrote Jewish religious poetry primarily in Arabic, and famous Jews who were popular in the Arab world in the mid-20th century, such as Leila Mourad), has been forgotten by Jews and Arabs alike due to the ideological elements of the Arab–Israeli conflict, and the desire by Israel's elite to portray a Western image of Jews and of the country. Odeh called upon Jewish and Arab members of the Knesset alike to support a new Knesset committee (which he had joined as a member) lobbying for the re-emphasizing of the culture of Jews from Arab and Muslim lands. In that speech, Odeh summarized his position thus: "The culture of the Jews of Arab and Islamic countries is a shared Jewish and Arab culture. Because of this, the state has fought [against] it, and yet because of this [same reason], we must fight to strengthen it."

Odeh says, "We represent those who are invisible in this country, and we give them a voice. We also bring a message of hope to all people, not just to the Arabs, but to the Jews, too".

In October 2015, Odeh gave support to the "unarmed Palestinian struggle". However, when asked about "throwing rocks, ... firebombs, and shooting at cars", Odeh responded that regarding throwing rocks, he supported the First Intifada.

In February 2016, Odeh considered resigning from the Knesset to show his protest against a controversial MK suspension bill.

Controversy

Shin Bet interrogations
Israel's internal intelligence agency, the Shin Bet, has interrogated Odeh many times in the past. He said in an interview to The New Yorker: "I was called three more times by the Shin Bet. They never hit me. But they succeeded in two things. I isolated myself from my friends—I became much more introverted. And I had the sense the Shin Bet was watching me no matter where I went. When I went to the bus station, and I saw some guy in sunglasses, I just assumed he was Shin Bet."

Death threats
A right-wing activist was arrested in February 2016 for making death threats against Odeh.

Umm al-Hiran incident

On 18 January 2017, Odeh was allegedly shot by a sponge-tipped bullet in the forehead by Israel Police as he protested against the demolition of homes in the Bedouin village of Umm al-Hiran. The police initially claimed that he was hit by stones thrown by other protestors. It later backtracked, claiming both that it had never stated that Odeh was hit by stones and that it didn't know what caused Odeh's head injury. 

The British Forensic Architecture, led by Eyal Weizman of Goldsmiths, University of London, which analyzed video evidence of the incident strongly suspected that Odeh had been hit by a sponge-tipped bullet because 47 seconds of video had been redacted – precisely the time during which Odeh was injured.

Notes and references

Sources

External links

Official website 

|-

1974 births
Living people
21st-century Israeli lawyers
Arab citizens of Israel
Arab members of the Knesset
City councillors of Haifa
Hadash leaders
Joint List politicians
Members of the 20th Knesset (2015–2019)
Members of the 21st Knesset (2019)
Members of the 22nd Knesset (2019–2020)
Members of the 23rd Knesset (2020–2021)
Members of the 24th Knesset (2021–2022)
Members of the 25th Knesset (2022–)
Politicians from Haifa